Pablo and Carolina (Spanish:Pablo y Carolina) is a 1957 Mexican romantic comedy film directed by Mauricio de la Serna and starring Pedro Infante, Irasema Dilián, Alejandro Ciangherotti, and premiered after Infante's death.

The film's sets were designed by the art director Manuel Fontanals. It was shot in Eastmancolor.

Cast
 Pedro Infante as Pablo Garza  
 Irasema Dilián as Carolina Cirol  
 Alejandro Ciangherotti as Enrique  
 Eduardo Alcaraz as Guillermo, mayordomo  
 Miguel Ángel Ferriz as Señor Cirol  
 Fanny Schiller as Señora Cirol  
 Arturo Soto Rangel as Señor Pablo Garza, abuelo de Pablo  
 Josefina Leiner as Lucila  
 Kika Meyer as Señorita directora  
 Yolanda Ortiz as Estudiante instituto  
 Constanza Hool as Chica baila con Pablo  
 Chela Nájera as Profesora 
 Lupe Legorreta as Thelma  
 Nicolás Rodríguez as Dr. Julio Rodríguez  
 Salvador Quiroz 
 Marcela Daviland as Pasajera en avion  
 Alicia Missioner 
 Telma Botello 
 Victor Jordan 
 Martha Patricia Rosado as Teresa, estudiante instituto 
 Enrique Zambrano as Alfredo  
 Lorenzo de Rodas as Carlos  
 Elena Julián as Luisa Morán  
 Alicia del Lago as Estudiante instituto  
 Genaro de Alba as Rodolfo  
 Diana Ochoa as Profesora  
 Federico Curiel as Rolando, mayordomo Enrique 
 Daniel Arroyo  as Espectador teatro  
 Irma Dorantes as Secretaria Pablo Garza
 Maruja Grifell as María, secretaria 
 Ana María Hernández as Adela, secretaria  
 Héctor Mateos as Señor Pablo Garza, padre de Pablo  
 Alejandra Meyer as Estudiante instituto
 Inés Murillo as María, portera instituto

References

Bibliography 
 Rogelio Agrasánchez. Mexican Movies in the United States: A History of the Films, Theaters, and Audiences, 1920-1960. McFarland & Company, 2006.

External links 
 

1957 films
1957 romantic comedy films
Mexican romantic comedy films
1950s Spanish-language films
Films scored by Manuel Esperón
1950s Mexican films